Navigators is a Norwegian pop band with lead singer Trond Andreassen (formerly of the Ricochets). The band released its debut single "Wall of Stone" in 2009 and its debut album The Straight and the Narrow in 2010. The band is signed to Sony Music.

Discography

Albums

Singles

References

External links
MySpace

Norwegian musical groups